B. Duraisamy is an Indian politician and former Member of the Legislative Assembly (MLA) of Tamil Nadu. He was elected to the Tamil Nadu legislative assembly from Varahur constituency as a Dravida Munnetra Kazhagam (DMK) candidate in the 1996 elections. The constituency was reserved for candidates from the Scheduled Castes.

References 

Year of birth missing (living people)
Living people
Dravida Munnetra Kazhagam politicians
Tamil Nadu MLAs 1996–2001